The Tartan Ten, also called the Tartan 10, is an American sailboat that was designed by Sparkman & Stephens as a one-design racer and first built in 1978.

The Tartan Ten design was developed into the LS-10 in the early 2000s.

Production
The design was built by Tartan Marine in the United States. The company produced 400 examples of the type between 1978 and 1988, but it is now out of production.

Design

The Tartan Ten is a recreational keelboat, built predominantly of fiberglass, with aluminum spars. It has a 7/8 fractional sloop rig, a raked stem, a reverse transom, an internally mounted spade-type rudder controlled by a tiller and a fixed fin keel. It displaces  and carries  of ballast.

The boat is fitted with a Farryman  diesel engine for docking and maneuvering.

Being intended for racing, the design has a flush deck and very little interior space. There are six berths, including a bow "V"-berth, which has the head underneath and a privacy curtain. The galley is located amidships and includes a manual pump sink and a portable ice box. The chart table doubles as a galley table.

The halyards are all internally-mounted, as is the reefing system and the 4:1 outhaul. The mast can be shaped by the shrouds and 4:1 mechanical advantage backstay. There are two jib sheet winches in the cockpit and two halyard winches on the cabin top. The boom vang has a 4:1 mechanical advantage and can also be employed as a preventer, when attached to the rail. A genoa track system was a factory option.

Lacking any cabin windows, ventilation is provided by a large deck hatch on the foredeck, which is also used to pass sails below for storage.

The design has a PHRF  racing average handicap of 126.

Variants
Tartan Ten
Initial model introduced in 1978.

LS-10
Southern Caribbean (SOCA) Sailboats produced an updated version of the Tartan Ten from the early-2000s until mid-2010s called the LS-10. It was built using the original hull molds and designed to conform to the Tartan Ten class rules for one-design racing, but with improved comfort, functionality and layout.

Operational history
In a 1992 review Richard Sherwood noted, "while the Tartan Ten was not designed to any rule, she was designed primarily for racing. The flush deck leaves little room in the cabin; and while there are six berths, the general cabin appointments are for weekends and overnights, not extended cruising. The Ten is a one-design and is delivered complete. No hull or rig alterations are allowed."

The Tartan Ten was inducted into the American Sailboat Hall of Fame in 1998. The citation, written by Josh Adams of Sail Magazine, noted, "Tartan Marine’s effect on the racing community with the T10 went beyond the boat. Now Sailors could forget about their boat’s rating and compete boat for boat. Inshore, Tartan’s energized approach to fleet development, spawned large fleets throughout the Midwest. The all purpose mission of the Tartan Ten: ready for offshore, good around the buoys, and fun for the small-family cruise or daysail."

See also
List of sailing boat types

Similar sailboats
C&C 3/4 Ton
C&C SR 33
DB-1
DB-2
Hobie 33
San Juan 33S

References

External links

Keelboats
1970s sailboat type designs
Sailing yachts
Sailboat type designs by Sparkman and Stephens
Sailboat types built by Tartan Marine